Banten International Stadium is a multi-function stadium with a capacity of 30,000 seats in Pabuaran, Serang Regency, Banten, Indonesia, which was inaugurated on 9 May 2022. The stadium name uses English to let the world know that Banten has an international stadium that satisfies FIFA standards. The stadium uses a unique design that features designs of Baduy batik and bamboo motifs. This stadium is part of the Banten Sports Center.

References 

Buildings and structures in Banten
Multi-purpose stadiums in Indonesia
Sport in Banten